At the 1906 Intercalated Games, four events in tennis were contested.  Though now termed the Intercalated Games, the 1906 Games were at the time regarded as an official Olympics event. This status was retroactively revoked by the International Olympic Committee. The events were played on outdoor clay courts at the Athens Lawn Tennis Club and were held from 23 April until the 28 April 1906.

Medal summary

Events

Medal table

References

 
1906 Intercalated Games events
1906
Olympics
1906 Olympics